The troops of the ballet of Saint Petersburg were created to the imperial theatres; after the revolution in 1917, it passed to the property of the State of USSR, with all structure of the Imperial theatres.

In the course of their existence, the troops worked in several theatrical buildings:

The Home of Opera at the edge of Neva (ru: Невская першпектива; on 1742–1749)

The Home of Opera near the Summer Garden (ru: Летний сад; on 1750–1763)

The Theatre Free Russian or the theatre of Karl Knipper (founded in 1777; in 1783 is bought to imperial treasure; then called the Wooden City Theatre (ru: Городской Деревянный театр) — on 1797)

The Hermitage Theatre (from 1785), the Imperial theater in the Gatchina Palace (to Paul I of Russia, the end of the 18th century)

The Bolshoi Kamenny Theatre (on 1784 - 1886)

The Alexandrinsky Theatre (from 1832; then the theatre became dramatic)

Mikhaylovsky Theatre (from 1833), the Theatre-circus (1849–1859, destroyed in the fire)

The Mariinsky Theatre (from 1860)

In 1870, the imperial ballet has officially moved to the Mariinsky Theatre, but the dancers participated in operas and dramas of other theatres of the imperial troupe.

After the revolution of 1917, each of the imperial theatres gained autonomy, and the ballet has started to be at the Mariinsky theatre. Dancers from the Mariinsky theatre's most have not been involved in productions of other theatres.

The Ballet masters of these troupes were:

 1733—1747 : Jean-Baptiste Landé
 1742—1759 : Antonio Rinaldi
 1758—1764 : Franz Hilverding
 1766—1772 : Gasparo Angiolini
 1779—1783 : Giuseppe Canziani
 1784—1792 : Giuseppe Canziani
 1792—1799 : Charles Le Picq
 1799—1801 : Pierre Peicam Chevalier (ru: Шевалье Пекен, Пьер)
 1801—1811 : Charles Didelot
 1803—1819 : Ivan Valberkh, in distribution with Didelot, then the only
 1816—1831 : Charles Didelot, in distribution with Valberkh, then the only
 1832 or 1832—1836 : Alexis Blache
 1832—1848 or 1837—1848 : Antoine Titus
 1848—1859 : Jules Perrot
 1859—1869 : Arthur Saint-Léon
 1869—1904 : Marius Petipa
 1904—1909 : Michel Fokine
 1909—1922 : Nikolai Legat
 1922—1931 : Fyodor Lopukhov
 1931—1937 : Agrippina Vaganova
 1938—1944 : Leonid Lavrovsky
 1944—1946 : Fedor Lopoukhov
 1946—1951 : Pyotr Gusev
 1951—1955 : Konstantin Sergeyev
 1955—1956 : Fedor Lopoukhov
 1956—1959 : Boris Fenster
 1960—1966 : Konstantin Sergeyev
 1967—1972 : Oleg Vinogradov
 1972—1977 : ?
 1977—1995 : Oleg Vinogradov
 1995—2008 : Makharbek Vaziev
 2008 — Yuri Fateyev (:ru:Фатеев, Юрий Валерьевич)

See also 
Ballet music
History of ballet
List of ballets by title
List of Russian ballet dancers

Notes 

Ballet-related lists
Ballet
Ballet